Notts Olympic Football Club was an English football club from the Radford district of Nottingham.

History
Notts Olympic was founded as Radford Excelsior, in the early 1870s, with matches reported from 1876.  

The club claimed a foundation date of 1884, even though there are reports of the club playing under the Notts Olympic name from 1882; the later foundation date marked when the club moved to the Churchfields ground and entered the FA Cup for the first time.

FA Cup main rounds

The club was not disgraced by its first FA Cup match in 1884, only losing 2-0 to Notts County in the first round.

The following year, the club beat Nottingham Wanderers in a replay at the Churchville ground, which proved to be the club's only win in the main draw.  In the next round, the club lost at Nottingham Forest by the same score, with the Olympans' play being described as "rough" and exhibiting "bad temper".  Forest repeated the result in 1886-87, and in 1887-88 the club were drawn to play Mellors Limited F.C. away from home.  After a 6-3 defeat, the Olympians protested that the Muskham Street ground was too small; on measuring it was found to be 13 yards too short, so the Football Association ordered a replay at Churchville.  It was to no avail as Mellors won the replayed match 2-1.

Qualifying round failures

The club continued to enter the FA Cup after qualifying rounds were introduced, but never got beyond the first match, the nadir being a 13-0 defeat to Leicester Fosse in 1894.  Its last entry was in 1896-97, losing 8-0 at home to Rushden.

The club also entered the Birmingham Senior Cup in the late 1880s, reaching the third round (last 16) in 1887-88 (having beaten Burton Swifts 4-0) and the same stage - now titled the first round proper - in 1888-89, losing 6-4 at home to Walsall Town Swifts.

Minor league football

As the club remained amateur, it became a founder member of the Midland Amateur Alliance in 1891, although the league only lasted two seasons.  The club therefore joined the Notts Amateur League, resigning before the end of the 1899-1900 season as the club was unable to fulfil its fixtures.

The club was revived in 1903, playing on the Forest ground, albeit solely playing junior football.  Its final record is finishing bottom but one in the Notts Alliance in 1913-14, and avoided last place only thanks to a points deduction for another club.

Notable players

Herbert Kilpin, founder of AC Milan, played for the club in 1890 and 1891.

Colours

The club originally played in white, changing to dark and light blue halves for the 1884-85 season.  In 1890 the club changed to red and green.  The club seems to have changed to black and red stripes in 1891, as Herbert Kilpin took the colours to Milan when he was sent there for business.

Grounds

The club's home matches were originally played "on the Forest" [recreation ground] before moving to Churchfields Lane in 1884.

Re-Established 
In 2023, there is hopes for Notts Olympic Football Club to be re-established and return to competitive football. Applications for the Nottingham side to join the league have been submitted and the search for a new home ground is underway.

Honours

Nottinghamshire Senior Cup: 
Runners-up: 1886-87, 1892-93

References

Defunct football clubs in Nottinghamshire
Football clubs in Nottingham
Association football clubs established in 1882
Association football clubs disestablished in 1914
1882 establishments in England
1914 disestablishments in England